Carafa is a surname held by:

 Tony Carafa, Australian rules footballer
 Members of the house of Carafa

See also
Carafa Chapel
Caraffa (disambiguation)
Palazzo Carafa (disambiguation)

Notes